Brian MacDonald (born December 3, 1943) is a Canadian sailor and Paralympic bronze medalist.

He competed in sailing at the 2000 Summer Paralympics in Sydney, where he won the bronze medal at the mixed three person sonar event, with team members David Williams and Paul Tingley. At the 2004 Games in Athens, he finished seventh, with team members Brian Mackie and Paul Tingley.

He was awarded the Canadian Yachting Association's Male Athlete of the Year Award together with David Williams, Paul Tingley, and Jamie Whitman in 2000.

References

External links
 
 

1943 births
Living people
Sailors at the 2000 Summer Paralympics
Sailors at the 2004 Summer Paralympics
Paralympic bronze medalists for Canada
Sportspeople from Vancouver
Medalists at the 2000 Summer Paralympics
Paralympic medalists in sailing
Paralympic sailors of Canada